Barchana or Badchana is a Vidhan Sabha constituency of Jajpur district, Odisha.
Area of this constituency includes Barachana block.

Elected members

15 elections held during 1951 to 2014. Elected members from the Barachana constituency are:
2019: (50): Amar Prasad Satapathy (BJD)
2014: (50): Amar Prasad Satapathy (BJD)
2009: (50): Amar Prasad Satapathy (NCP)
2004: (27): Sitakanta Mohapatra (Congress)
2000: (27): Amar Prasad Satapathy (BJD)
1995: (27): Amar Prasad Satapathy (Janata Dal)
1990: (27): Amar Prasad Satapathy (Janata Dal)
1985: (27): Sitakanta Mohapatra (Congress)
1980: (27): Sitakanta Mohapatra (Congress-I)
1977: (27): Managobinda Samal (Janata Party)
1974: (27): Dusasan Jena (CPI(M))
1971: (24): Managobinda Samal (SUCI)
1967: (24): Jagannath Das (Praja Socialist Party)
1961: (115): Dhananjaya Lenka (Congress)
1957: (82): Jadumani Mangaraj (Congress)
1951: (65): Nabakrushna Choudhuri (Congress)

2019 election results
In 2019 Odisha Legislative Assembly election, Biju Janata Dal candidate Amar Prasad Satapathy defeated Bharatiya Janata Party candidate Amar Kumar Nayak by a margin of 1485 votes.

2014 election results
In 2014 Odisha Legislative Assembly election, Biju Janata Dal candidate Amar Prasad Satapathy defeated Indian National Congress candidate Janmejoy Lenka by a margin of 16,939 votes.

Results of the 2009 election
In 2009 election, Nationalist Congress Party candidate Amar Prasad Satapathy defeated Indian National Congress candidate Sitakanta Mohapatra by a margin of 10,649 votes.

Notes

References

Assembly constituencies of Odisha
Jajpur district